The international legal system is the foundation for the conduct of international relations. It is this system that regulates state actions under international law. The principal subjects of international law are states, rather than individuals as they are under municipal law. The International Court of Justice acknowledged in the Reparation for Injuries case that types of international legal personality other than statehood could exist and that the past half century has seen a significant expansion of the subjects of international law. Apart from states, international legal personality is also possessed by international organisations and, in some circumstance, human beings. In addition, non-governmental organisations and national liberation movements have also been said to possess international legal personality.

Since 1945 the international legal system has been dominated by the United Nations and the structures that were established as part of that organisation. While the UN has been the object of significant criticism, it has nevertheless played a pivotal role both in the progressive development and codification of international law.

The General Assembly of the UN has sponsored and promoted some of the most important developments of the last fifty years through the adoption of multilateral treaties and instruments. The Convention on the Law of the Sea 1982 and the Vienna Convention on the Law of Treaties 1969 are two of the most prominent examples.

A significant role in the legal work of the UN is played by the Sixth Committee (Legal), one of the six committees of the General Assembly. The Committee deals with international law under Article 13(1)(a) of the Charter, which authorises the General Assembly to initiate studies and make recommendations to encourage the progressive development and codification of international law.

See also 

 International arbitration
International litigation

Bibliography
Reparation for Injuries Suffered in the Service of the United Nations (Advisory Opinion) [1949] ICJ Reports 174 at 178.

Further reading
Janne Elisabeth Nijman, The Concept of International Legal Personality: An Inquiry into the History and Theory of International Law (Asser Press, The Hague, Netherlands 2004)

References

External links
 United Nations - International Law

Legal system